Product-service systems (PSS) are business models that provide for cohesive delivery of products and services. PSS models are emerging as a means to enable collaborative consumption of both products and services, with the aim of pro-environmental outcomes.

Description 

Product service systems, put simply, are when a firm offers a mix of both products and services, in comparison to the traditional focus on products. As defined by (van Halen, te Riele, Goedkoop) "a marketable set of products and services capable of jointly fulfilling a user's needs", PSSes can be realized by smart products.

The initial move to PSS was largely motivated by the need on the part of traditional manufacturing firms to cope with changing market forces and the recognition that services in combination with products could provide higher profits than products alone. Faced with shrinking markets and increased commoditization of their products, these firms saw service provision as a new path towards profits and growth.

While not all product service systems result in the reduction of material consumption, they are more widely being recognized as an important part of a firm's environmental strategy. In fact, some researchers have redefined PSS as necessarily including improved environmental improvement. For example, Mont defines PSS as "a system of products, services, supporting networks, and infrastructure that is designed to be competitive, satisfy customers' needs, and have a lower environmental impact than traditional business models." Mont elaborates on her definition as follows: A PSS is a pre-designed system of products, services, supporting infrastructures, and necessary networks that is a so-called dematerialized solution to consumer preferences and needs. It has also been defined as a "self-learning" system, one of whose goals is continual improvement.

This view of PSS is similar to other concepts commonly seen in the environmental management literature, such as "dematerialization" and "servicizing".

PSS has been used to create value for customers beyond selling products as functions. Typically, there are four approaches to PSS design.
 Function-based PSS: add new functions to increase product value in the competing market. For example, General Motors added OnStar in 1992 to product emergency services for customers. It integrated GPS with vehicle sensory system for telematics-based on-demand services.
 Value-added PSS: companies added new features to increase value of a product to expand its value to customers and users. For example, Otis Elevator added Remote Elevator Maintenance (REM) system to its fleet system to monitor their elevators to reduce failures. GE Healthcare (formerly GE Medical Systems) developed InSite to remotely monitor its medical equipment in order to reduce service costs and increase users' 
 Evidence-based Service: companies use big data analytics to provide the actual saving and further develop a service contract for customer to pay for part of the savings.

There are many methodologies on PSS design. Dominant Innovation system uses an Innovation Matrix to identify gaps from customer's fear, not needs based on scenario-based path finding. A new value-chain ecosystem can be further developed to link these gaps between two invisible spaces. For example, John Deere developed Agric Service business based on the customers' worries on soil related issues. It integrates sensors with GPS to develop cognitive site map about soil content to optimize crop yields.

In recent years, PSS has been further integrated with big data analytics for accelerated innovation. Other technologies such as prognostics, health management and cyber-physical systems have further created service innovation technologies for PSS. For example, Alstom has been developing Train Tracer technologies since 2006 and is implementing Health Hub system for its transport fleets.

Servicizing  
"Servicizing" is a transaction through which value is provided by a combination of products and services in which the satisfaction of customer needs is achieved either by selling the function of the product rather than the product itself, or by increasing the service component of a product offer. The concept is based on the idea that what customers want from products is not necessarily ownership, but rather the function that the product provides or the service the product can deliver. This means that the provider of "servicizing solutions" may get paid by the unit-of-service (or product function) delivered, as opposed to the (more traditional) unit-of-products sold. See service economy for more on the servitization of products.

Types
One type of servicizing solutions is based on transactions where payment is made—not for the "product"—but for the "product-service package" (part of PSS) which has been sold to the customer. This servicized purchase extends the buying transaction from a one-time sale (product acquisition), to a long-term service relationship (such as in the case of a long-term maintenance-free service contract).

Another type of servicizing may be a strategy for providing access to services for people who cannot afford to buy products outright. For example, in the case where auto ownership is economically unfeasible, creative servicizing offers at least three possible solutions: one in which transportation can be achieved simultaneously (as in car-pooling); one in which transportation can be achieved sequentially (as in car-sharing); and one in which transportation can be achieved eventually (rent-to-own).

Types 
There are various issues in the nomenclature of the discussion of PSS, not least that services are products, and need material products in order to support delivery, however, it has been a major focus of research for several years. The research has focussed on a PSS as system comprising tangibles (the products) and intangibles (the services) in combination for fulfilling specific customer needs. The research has shown that manufacturing firms are more amenable to producing "results", rather than solely products as specific artefacts, and that consumers are more amenable to consuming such results. This research has identified three classes of PSS:

Product Oriented PSS: This is a PSS where ownership of the tangible product is transferred to the consumer, but additional services, such as maintenance contracts, are provided.
Use Oriented PSS: This is a PSS where ownership of the tangible product is retained by the service provider, who sells the functions of the product, via modified distribution and payment systems, such as sharing, pooling, and leasing.
Result Oriented PSS: This is a PSS where products are replaced by services, such as, for example, voicemail replacing answering machines.

This typology has been criticized for failing to capture the complexity of PSS examples found in practice. Aas et al. for example proposed a typology with eight categories relevant in the digital era, whereas Van Ostaeyen et al. proposed an alternative that categorizes PSS types according to two distinguishing features: the performance orientation of the dominant revenue mechanism and the degree of integration between product and service elements. According to the first distinguishing feature, a PSS can be designated as input-based (IB), availability-based (AB), usage-based (UB) or performance-based (PB). The performance-based type can be further subdivided into three subtypes:

Solution oriented (PB-SO) PSS: (e.g. selling a promised level of heat transfer efficiency instead of selling radiators)
Effect oriented (PB-EO) PSS: (e.g. selling a promised temperature level in a building instead of selling radiators)
Demand-fulfillment oriented (PB-DO) PSS: (e.g. selling a promised level of thermal comfort for building occupants instead of selling radiators)

According to the second distinguishing feature, a PSS can be designated as segregated, semi-integrated, and integrated, depending on to what extent the product and service elements (e.g. maintenance service, spare parts) are combined into a single offering.

Examples 
The following existing offerings illustrate the PSS concept:
 Xerox' pay-per-copy model for selling office equipment
 Atlas Copco's Contract Air service, whereby air compressors are sold per m3 of compressed air delivered
 Philips' pay-per-lux model for selling lighting equipment, whereby customers pay for a promised level of illuminance in a building
 Michelin's fleet management solution whereby truck sold per kilometer driven

Case study 
In the framework of the European research program of TURAS (Transitioning towards urban resilience and sustainability), a study, in Belgium, explored new hybrid-combinations between products and services systems in order to develop new creative and sustainable business opportunities (both economically viable and creating new jobs) for the Brussels-Capital Region.
Five workshops have been organized on the following topics:

After 5 co-creation workshops, with more than 50 different stakeholders, and the use of specifics tools, 17 PSS inspiring and promising ideas were identified. After a selection process 4 were chosen for further development of their business models through a series of tools (debugging, light experimentation, simulation, etc.). The study led to the development of a practical toolkit (freely downloadable): PSS Toolkit – Development of innovative business models for product-service systems in an urban context of sustainable transition.

Impact 
Several authors assert that product service systems will improve eco-efficiency by what is termed "factor 4", i.e. an improvement by a factor of 4 times or more, by enabling new and radical ways of transforming what they call the "product-service mix" that satisfy consumer demands while also improving the effects upon the environment.

van Halen et al. state that the knowledge of PSS enables both governments to formulate policy with respect to sustainable production and consumption patterns, and companies to discover directions for business growth, innovation, diversification, and renewal.

Tietze and Hansen discuss the impact of PSS on firms' innovation behavior identifying three determinants. First, product ownership is not transferred to the customers, but remains with the PSS operating firm. Second, the purpose of a product is different if it is used within PSS solutions than compared to the purpose of products in classical transaction based business models. When offering PSS, products are used as a means for offering a service. Third, the profit function of PSS operating firms differs substantially from profit functions of firms that develop, manufacture and sell their products.

From a manufacturer's perspective, the business potential of a PSS is determined by an interplay of four mechanisms: cost reduction, increased customer value, changes to the company's competitive environment and an expansion of the customer base.

See also 
Extended producer responsibility
Life cycle thinking
Performance-based contracting
Product stewardship
Sharing economy

References

Further reading 
Books and papers
 
 
 
 
 
 
 
 
  – a set of reports commissioned by the Dutch Ministry of Economic Affairs and the Ministry of Housing, Spatial Planning and the Environment
 
 
 
 
 
 
 
 
 
 
 
 
 
 
 
 

On dematerialization
 
 
 

Business models